Vijila Chirappad is an Indian Dalit poet who writes in Malayalam.

Life and work
Born in Kozhikode, Kerala, Chirappad's poems speak of the experience of living life as a Dalit woman. Her poetry explores how the double burden of gender and caste shapes the lives and struggles of Dalit women in Kerala in distinct ways than women of dominant castes.  Her work also discusses how, despite its communist history, casteism pervades everyday life in Kerala.

Chirappad's work includes three collections of poetry in Malayalam: Adukala Illathaa Veedu (A Home without a Kitchen, 2006), Amma Oru Kalpanika Kavitha Alla (Mother is not a Poetic Figment of our Imagination, 2009), and Pakarthi Ezhuthu (Copied Notes, 2015).  Her poems "A Place for Me",  "Can't Grow My Nails" and "The Autobiography of a Bitch" have also been included in the 2012 Oxford India Anthology of Malayalam Dalit Writing.

Chirappad has participated in the Kerala Literature festival and also in the prestigious Hay Festival of Literature and Arts as part of an event on Dalit Poetry in Malayalam.

References 

Dalit writers
Indian women poets
Malayalam poets
Writers from Kozhikode